Sweetening is the process of making food more sweet. Wikipedia does not yet have an article on this process.

Sweetening may also refer to:

 Copper sweetening, a petroleum refining process
 Food sweetening, adding the basic taste of sweetness to a food
 Gas sweetening, a group of processes that use aqueous solutions of various amines to remove hydrogen sulfide and carbon dioxide from gases, see Amine gas treating
 Pipe sweetening, a method by which foul tasting residues are removed from the bowl and shank of a briar tobacco pipe
 Sweetening (show business), the use of a laugh track in addition to a live studio audience in television
 Sweetening, an audio technician terminology used for artificial laughter inserted into the show